The Estádio do Bessa (now Estádio do Bessa Sec. XXI) is a football stadium located in the Boavista area of Porto, Portugal, used by Boavista F.C.

Like other stadiums used in Euro 2004, the Bessa is a new ground but built on top of the old stands, with each new stand being constructed at different times, which allowed Boavista F.C. to continue playing there during the project. The former Campo do Bessa existed on the same place as the new stadium since 1911.

It cost €45,164,726 to build, from which €7,785,735 was supported from the Portuguese state, and has an all-seater capacity of 28,263. Plans for improvement existed before the organization of the Euro 2004 was given to Portugal in 1999, and by then the first works were already underway. It was designed by Grupo3 Arquitectura.

Euro 2004 matches

Portugal national football team

The following national team matches were held in the stadium.

References

External links

Grupo3 arquitectura

Boavista F.C.
UEFA Euro 2004 stadiums
Bessa
Sports venues in Porto
Sports venues completed in 1911